Mark Raymond Bonham Carter, Baron Bonham-Carter (11 February 1922 – 4 September 1994) was an English publisher and politician.   He was created a life peer in 1986.

Early life
He was the son of the Liberal activists Sir Maurice Bonham-Carter and his wife, the former Lady Violet Asquith, daughter of the Liberal Prime Minister H. H. Asquith. He was the second-youngest of four children; Helen, Laura and Raymond.

Educated at Winchester College and Balliol College, Oxford, where he read PPE, his studies were interrupted by the Second World War, and he was commissioned in the Grenadier Guards in November 1941. Captured in Tunisia in 1943 and imprisoned in Italy, he escaped and walked four hundred miles to return to British lines, being mentioned in dispatches. Bonham-Carter concluded the war by standing as the unsuccessful Liberal candidate for Barnstaple in the 1945 general election, before returning to finish the last year of his course at Oxford. He then spent a year at the University of Chicago before going into publishing, working for the Collins publishing firm but left as his directors did not agree with his political activities.

In 1955, he married Leslie, Lady St Just, the former wife of Peter George Grenfell, 2nd Baron St Just (1922–1984), and the younger daughter of American magazine publisher Condé Nast. By her, Bonham-Carter had three daughters: Jane (created Baroness Bonham-Carter of Yarnbury), Virginia and Eliza Bonham Carter. He also had a stepdaughter from his wife's former marriage.

Torrington
Bonham-Carter's family continued its heavy involvement in Liberal politics, especially when his sister Laura married the Liberal leader Jo Grimond. It was in 1958 that the Torrington by-election was called in a safe Conservative seat, and Bonham-Carter became the Liberal candidate. Much to everyone's surprise, he won, overturning a 9,000 majority, giving the Liberals their first by-election gain since 1929. Bonham-Carter's margin of victory was extremely slim, at just 219 votes. Nonetheless, it was a major boost to the success-deprived Liberals and the first in a string of by-election victories that would make up the postwar Liberal Revival.

Grimond was personally hopeful that the articulate Bonham-Carter would be his designated successor, but it was not to be: at the 1959 general election, just 18 months after his victory, he narrowly lost the seat to the Conservatives. He continued to be a close advisor to Grimond throughout the latter's leadership but would never again be an MP, despite a third, unsuccessful, and equally close candidature for Torrington at the 1964 general election.

Later life
Bonham Carter found other outlets for his political and publishing interests. He continued to work as a prominent member of the Collins firm, becoming close friends with Roy Jenkins (reportedly his wife's lover) and serving as his literary agent. He became the first chairman of the Race Relations Board 1966–1971, and its successor, the Community Relations Commission 1971–1977. He was also prominent in the Arts world, as one of the directors of the Royal Opera House 1958–1982, a Governor of the Royal Ballet 1960–1994 (chairman of the board after 1985), and vice-chairman of the BBC 1975–1980, being vetoed as chairman by Margaret Thatcher. On 21 July 1986 he was created a life peer as Baron Bonham-Carter, of Yarnbury in the County of Wiltshire. He became Foreign Affairs spokesman for the Liberal Democrats. His last campaign focused on granting British citizenship to ethnic minorities in Hong Kong, a measure that was only passed after his death. He was also an uncle of the actress Helena Bonham Carter.

He died from a heart attack in Italy on 4 September 1994.

Arms

See also
Bonham Carter family

Notes

References

External links 
 
 

Bonham Carter of Yarnbury
Bonham Carter of Yarnbury
Asquith family
Military personnel from London
Bonham Carter of Yarnbury
BBC Governors
British Army personnel of World War II
Bonham Carter of Yarnbury
Bonham Carter of Yarnbury
Bonham-Carter, Mark
Bonham Carter of Yarnbury
Bonham-Carter, Mark
Mark
English expatriates in the United States
British World War II prisoners of war
World War II prisoners of war held by Italy
Sons of life peers
Bonham Carter 2
Life peers created by Elizabeth II